On The Wings was a 1973 album released by Socrates Drank The Conium.  It features a heavier sound than the previous records, reminiscent of that of 70s bands such as Led Zeppelin and progressive Black Sabbath.  They did not lose their blues roots, however, as evidenced by such tracks as "This Is The Rats".

For the recording of this album, Socrates Drank The Conium recruited a second guitarist in addition to Yannis Spathas.  His name was Gus Doukakis.

Track listing

"Who Is To Blame" — 3:47
"Distruction"[sic] — 4:32
"Naked Trees" — 5:00
"Death Is Gonna Die" — 3:33
"This Is The Rats" — 2:49
"Lovesick Kid's Blues" — 2:50
"On The Wings Of Death" — 3:25
"Breakdown" — 3:04
"Triping In A Crystal Forest"[sic] — 1:49
"Regulations ( If I Were A President )" - 2:40

Sources
http://rateyourmusic.com/artist/socrates_drank_the_conium
 
https://web.archive.org/web/20070615170211/http://aquariusrecords.org/cat/rockpopprogrock7.html

1973 albums
Socrates Drank the Conium albums